is a fictional character and the protagonist of Nintendo's video game franchise The Legend of Zelda. He was created by Japanese video game designer Shigeru Miyamoto. Link was introduced as the hero of the original 1986 The Legend of Zelda video game and has appeared in a total of 19 entries in the series, as well as a number of spin-offs. Common elements in the series include Link travelling through Hyrule whilst exploring dungeons, battling creatures and solving puzzles until he eventually defeats the series' primary antagonist, Ganon, and saves Princess Zelda.

Throughout The Legend of Zelda series, Link has made multiple appearances in a variety of incarnations. He has been rendered in both 2D and 3D form and has been traditionally depicted in his signature green cap and tunic carrying a sword and shield. Over the course of the series, he appears as a child or young adult of the Hylian race, which originates from the fictional kingdom of Hyrule. Within Zelda lore, Link is the soul of a legendary hero that throughout history is reincarnated within a seemingly ordinary boy or man when the need arises for a new warrior to defeat the forces of evil. To defeat Ganon, Link usually obtains the mystical Master Sword or a similar legendary weapon, which is obtained after completing various trials. Over the course of his journey, he also acquires other magical items, including musical instruments and other weaponry.

In addition to the main series, Link has appeared in other Nintendo media, including merchandise, comics and manga, and an animated television series. He is a prominent character in various spin-off games, including Hyrule Warriors, Cadence of Hyrule and Hyrule Warriors: Age of Calamity. He has appeared in entries of several other game franchises, including the Super Smash Bros. series, SoulCalibur II and Mario Kart 8, and has also been referenced in other games, such as The Elder Scrolls V: Skyrim.

Alongside fellow Nintendo character Mario, Link is one of the most recognisable characters in the video game industry, with critics considering him to be a significant game character in popular culture. He has been positively received by critics and fans and is a popular character within the video game community. According to Guinness World Records, Link is the most critically acclaimed videogame playable character and the most ubiquitous action-adventure video game character, surpassing Mario. He has been recognised by the Guinness World Records Gamer's Edition as the second best video game character of all time after Mario. Critics have also named him as one of the most influential video game characters of all time and one of Shigeru Miyamoto's most famous creations.

Concept and creation 

Link's creator, Shigeru Miyamoto, said that his concepts of The Legend of Zelda and Link were based on his childhood memories as well as books and movies he and video game designer Takashi Tezuka had enjoyed, notably J. R. R. Tolkien's The Lord of the Rings. Miyamoto tried to make people identify with Link and have the opportunity to be heroes like the character. Although at the end of some games, Link becomes vastly talented in physical skill and magical prowess, he usually starts off the game as a regular boy.

Link's sprite design was created by designer Takashi Tezuka. Shigeru Miyamoto stated in an interview with Gamekult that Takashi Tezuka used the Disney character Peter Pan as a source of inspiration when creating Link in order to make the character recognisable. Due to the limited capabilities of the technology at the time, Nintendo was only able to use three colours and the development team decided to choose green as Link's signature colour, as the game was mainly set within a forest environment. Link's sword and shield, long hat and ears were all created to make the character easily distinguishable.

On the origin of the name "Link", Miyamoto said that "Link's name comes from the fact that originally, the fragments of the Triforce were supposed to be electronic chips. The game was to be set in both the past and the future and as the main character would travel between both and be the link between them, they called him Link". However, he has also stated in the Nintendo book titled Hyrule Historia that the character is named Link because he, "connects people together" and that, "he was supposed to spread the scattered energy of the world through the ages".

Character incarnations 
There have been several iterations of Link within The Legend of Zelda series. Each incarnation of Link bears a similar appearance and role as the hero within the various Zelda games, with nearly every game resetting the storyline. According to The Legend of Zelda Encyclopedia, Link is "not just one individual; he is the hero reborn to many homes, over the course of many lifetimes, chosen by the goddesses with a single purpose: to stand up and fight when evil descends upon Hyrule". Miyamoto explained: "For every Zelda game we tell a new story, but we actually have an enormous document that explains how the game relates to the others, and bind them together. But to be honest, they are not that important to us. We care more about developing the game system ... give the player new challenges for every chapter that is born". Although each version of Link is different to the next, an official chronology for the Zelda series was established by Nintendo, which spans thousands of years across the fictional history of Hyrule and includes three separate timelines. In celebration of The Legend of Zelda's 25th anniversary, Nintendo released (in December 2011, in Japan; in early 2013, in North America) an anthology, titled Hyrule Historia, which details The Legend of Zelda fictional timeline. Hyrule Historia explains Link's repeated incarnations in the fictional timeline by stating that the name "Link" is a common name in Hyrule. The Legend of Zelda: Skyward Sword, which was released in 2011, aimed to create an origin story, in which the antagonist Demise curses "the spirit of the hero" to be caught in an endless cycle of defeating evil.

Character design 
Link's appearance has remained consistent over the course of The Legend of Zelda series but his character design has also evolved with each game release. In the original 1986 The Legend of Zelda, he appears dressed in green in a simple 2D form viewed from a top-down perspective. This was followed by a taller version of the character seen from a side-scroll perspective in the 1987 video game titled The Adventure of Link. With the release of The Legend of Zelda: Ocarina of Time in 1998, Link appeared as a 3D character. Miyamoto said that the team started by creating a grown-up model followed by a child model, but realised that they could both be used in the game, "to tell the story of a boy growing up". Link's teenage appearance in Ocarina of Time was designed with the aim of making him more handsome and cooler than all previous forms of the hero. Nintendo illustrator Yusuke Nakano has stated that the design of Link in Ocarina of Time was based on a well-known American actor at the time of the game's development.

In 2002, Shigeru Miyamoto unveiled an anime-inspired design for Link at E3 2002, which had been created for The Legend of Zelda: The Wind Waker. The "Toon Link" incarnation proved to be initially controversial and was not well received due to its childlike cartoonish style. Toon Link was originally created by graphic designer Yoshiki Haruhana as a way to evolve the series. Miyamoto commented in a 2003 interview: "Actually we never intended to create a shockwave, it's just we were trying to make something new". He said that after many experiments, the development team had decided that cel-shading was the best option for expressing a young, energetic boy. Toon Link would eventually carve his own identity into the franchise, appearing in multiple entries in the series and also being introduced as a playable character in Super Smash Bros. Producer Eiji Aonuma explained that after the initial reaction to the new art style, gamers began to accept Toon Link, and commented, "so after Wind Waker we created Phantom Hourglass and Spirit Tracks with the new artwork style". 

Following the public reaction to Toon Link, Nintendo chose to completely reverse the art style for The Legend of Zelda: Twilight Princess in 2006. In this entry, Link was depicted in a more realistic style with a darker, grittier tone. Initially the artists planned to design Link in his mid-to-late twenties. Nintendo artists Yusuke Nakano and Satoru Takizawa discussed the design concept in the Nintendo book titled The Legend of Zelda: Art and Artifacts, in which Nakano stated: "I wanted him to be a little bit older. The Link up till now had been in his teens, but for this one we were talking about making him around 25… maybe even 30. ... He would be well built… A skinny man with a pretty face wouldn't stand a chance against a large enemy, so we thought about making him quite sturdy". However, this idea was rejected, as the team expected that fans wanted to see Link as he appeared in Ocarina of Time. The design team decided to make Link a teenager again, aged 16 years. Miyamoto explained: "So after Wind Waker we tried several different models and made varied versions of them. Ultimately we decided that in showing a teenage Link really the best style of expressing him would be something that's closer to our graphical style in Ocarina of Time". Eiji Aonuma explained that the design team had looked at ways of expressing Link as an older teenager, saying, "the fact that we're seeing Link on horseback and swinging a sword, I think that's one more way in which Link has matured". In Twilight Princess, a key aspect of Link's role is the ability to transform into a wolf. Aonuma explained that a wolf was chosen because the design team considered the animal to be the best representation of a hero and that this function was incorporated to give the adult version of Link limited human abilities, allowing him to mature over the course of the game.

Link's signature green outfit has evolved over the course of The Legend of Zelda series. At a Game Developers Conference in San Francisco, Art Director Satoru Takizawa commented on the subtle changes made to Link's outfit for each game release. He said that for Twilight Princess he, "made the hat long, so it would flap in the wind and move around", but for the release of Skyward Sword, he decided to make it more diminutive and give it less motion. The release of The Legend of Zelda: Breath of the Wild in 2017 broke the conventions of Link's design, notably the absence of his signature green outfit as a prominent feature. Takizawa explained that "as the graphic fidelity has increased it becomes more difficult to make that hat look cool". However, players can still acquire Link's green hat and tunic within the game. For Breath of the Wild nearly 100 designs were considered for Link to ensure that he remained a neutral character. Eiji Aonuma commented: "We thought that the iconic green tunic and hat had become expected, so we wanted to mix things up and update his look. Interestingly, though, nobody on the team said, 'Let's make him blue!' It just organically ended up that way".

Although Link is depicted as a male character, Eiji Aonuma stated that he wanted the character to be gender neutral. He said of Link's portrayal in Ocarina of Time: "I wanted the player to think 'Maybe Link is a boy or a girl'. If you saw Link as a guy, he'd have more of a feminine touch. Or vice versa, if you related to Link as a girl, it was with more of a masculine aspect. I really wanted the designer to encompass more of a gender-neutral figure. So I've always thought that for either female or male players, I wanted them to be able to relate to Link". During the development of Twilight Princess, he created a more masculine version of Link, but then later decided to return Link to a more gender neutral character. Regarding Link's character design in Breath of the Wild, Aonuma commented that "as far as gender goes, Link is definitely a male, but I wanted to create a character where anybody would be able to relate to the character".

Portrayal 
Since the first instance of voice acting in the series (in Ocarina of Time), Link has been voiced by eight actors: Nobuyuki Hiyama in Ocarina of Time (as adult Link); Fujiko Takimoto in Ocarina of Time (as young Link), Majora's Mask, A Link to the Past and Four Swords for the Game Boy Advance and Minish Cap; Sachi Matsumoto in The Wind Waker; Akira Sasanuma in Twilight Princess; Yūki Kodaira in Spirit Tracks; Takashi Ōhara in Skyward Sword; Mitsuki Saiga in A Link Between Worlds and Link's Awakening (the 2019 version only); and Kengo Takanashi in Breath of the Wild. In Tri Force Heroes, Fujiko Takimoto, Sachi Matsumoto, Yūki Kodaira and Mitsuki Saiga all reprise their roles as Link, acting as alternate voices.

As no canonical game in The Legend of Zelda series to date has contained substantial spoken dialogue for Link, the part consists only of short phrases, grunts, battle cries, and other sounds. In The Wind Waker, however, Link has been heard saying the phrase, "Come on!" Voice acting for the character has been deliberately limited to avoid contradicting players' individual interpretations of how Link could sound. Producer Eiji Aonuma stated that Link's silence is meant to avoid breaking the relationship between the player and the character that could result from adding dialogue with which the player does not agree. Link's character has been purposefully left open to interpretation to offer a blank slate for players to enter the game world and provide a more personal experience.

Characteristics 
Link is a brave, skilled warrior and the hero of The Legend of Zelda series. Over the course of the series, he has appeared in a variety of ages and forms, ranging from child to young adult, and in Twilight Princess, also appears in the form of a wolf. He displays the characteristic traits of the Hylian race, being of human form with elfin features, including pointed ears. Since the original 1986 The Legend of Zelda video game, he has been repeatedly depicted wearing his characteristic green cap and tunic. However, he has also appeared wearing other outfits, including a blue lobster shirt in The Wind Waker and his blue Champion's Tunic in Breath of the Wild. Link is described in the original game's instruction manual as a "young lad" and a traveller and in later games, such as Breath of the Wild, as a knight of Hyrule who is sworn to protect the kingdom and Princess Zelda. During gameplay, he carries a sword and a shield, but has also wielded a variety of other weapons, including bows, spears and axes.

Link's signature weapon is the Master Sword, a powerful magic sword that has the ability to repel evil. He is also often depicted holding the Hylian Shield. These two components have become integral aspects of the character's identity. Each game in the series follows a similar story arc in which Link must take a journey that eventually leads him to recover the Master Sword, which makes him stronger in gameplay and enables him to defeat the series' main antagonist, Ganon.

Throughout each game, Link is able to obtain various items during his adventures, which the player can then use in gameplay. Many of these objects possess magical properties that bestow specific abilities on Link, such as a magic cape that makes Link invisible when he wears it, or potions that replenish his health. Others have various practical purposes, such as the hookshot, which enables Link to pull items towards him, and bombs for detonation. In addition, Link has used various musical instruments on his travels, most notably, the Ocarina of Time, which when played is used for teleportation. In Breath of the Wild, Link's key tool is the Sheikah Slate, a handheld tablet featuring various runes that enable him to manipulate the game world.

In Zelda lore, Link is the reincarnated soul of a hero, chosen by the goddess Hylia to protect the kingdom of Hyrule from Ganon and save Princess Zelda whenever the need arises. As the goddess' chosen hero, he is also the bearer of the Triforce of Courage, one of the three components that together combine to form the Triforce, a sacred artefact and symbol of power. In several Zelda games, Link's main objective is to recover the fragments of the Triforce in order to defeat Ganon. Link's character is always depicted as a fearless hero and a "symbol of courage" who is willing to protect Hyrule for the sake of others.

Relationships 
Link's relationships with the other main characters has been a defining aspect of the series. Within the fictional lore, Ganon, Zelda and Link represent three pieces of the Triforce, with Ganon representing Power, Zelda representing Wisdom and Link representing Courage. This trinity transcends the fictional timeline and dictates that the three characters are destined to be forever reincarnated in an endless battle for good and evil. Link's battle with Ganon established a fictional chronology that spans across the entire series and branches into three separate timelines. The three timelines originate at the end of Ocarina of Time when the timeline splits according to whether Link successfully defeats Ganon ("The Hero is Victorious") or fails to stop him (the "Fallen Hero" timeline). The official fictional chronology was revealed in Hyrule Historia, with Skyward Sword presented as the first game in the timeline. Skyward Sword establishes that the three main characters are destined to be connected in an endless cycle after the antagonist Demise curses Link and Zelda.

Link's relationship with Zelda has been a core aspect of the series but has also been the subject of speculation. Throughout the games, the storylines have suggested the possibility of a romantic relationship between the two, but this has remained ambiguous. With each game release, the nature of their relationship has varied and Link has also been presented with other possible love interests. A romantic relationship between Link and Zelda is particularly evident in Skyward Sword and was also emphasised in an official "romance trailer" for the game. Eiji Aonuma commented on this relationship in an interview with Game Informer: "As far as the love story goes, it wasn't that we wanted to create a romance between Link and Zelda as much as we wanted the player to feel like this is a person who's very important to me, who I need to find. We used that hint of a romance between the two to tug at the heartstrings". In Breath of the Wild, the relationship between Link and Zelda is more complex and follows a story arc that begins with resentment and ends in a close bond with each willing to give their life for the other.

Appearances and evolution

The Legend of Zelda series 
Link has appeared as the protagonist of The Legend of Zelda series for over three decades. In addition to appearing in every video game in The Legend of Zelda series, he has also appeared as a major character in various spin-off games. Although the plot in each Zelda game varies, most center around Link defeating Ganon with the Master Sword and rescuing Princess Zelda. During gameplay, Link must navigate through various dungeons, defeat monsters and solve puzzles before reaching the end of the game.

Link was introduced on the Nintendo Entertainment System (NES) in the original 1986 game release The Legend of Zelda. Due to the limited hardware of the era, Link was rendered as a simple 8-bit 2D character within a flat environment viewed from a top-down perspective. In the opening introduction, he meets an old man who offers him a sword and declares "It's dangerous to go alone!" Link is described as a "young lad" who saves Princess Zelda's elderly nursemaid Impa from Ganon's henchmen. Link assumes the role of the hero and must rescue Princess Zelda and the kingdom of Hyrule from the evil wizard Ganon, who has stolen the Triforce of Power. During the game, the player controls Link as he explores 128 areas of Hyrule. Nine dungeons each contain a special item that gives Link the ability to defeat that dungeon's boss; he must defeat them all before fighting Ganon.

In Zelda II: The Adventure of Link (1987), Link reappeared on the NES with some minor changes to his design but still as a basic 8-bit 2D character. He is depicted as a slightly taller character sprite wearing a green outfit similar to his previous appearance. The game differs from the previous title in that it switches between a top-down perspective and a side-scroll perspective. The storyline involves Link going on a quest to place a crystal in each of six castles in Hyrule so that he can later break the magically protected Great Palace, defeat his doppelgänger Dark Link (also known as Shadow Link), claim the Triforce of Courage, reunite the three pieces of the Triforce, and awaken sleeping Zelda. The Dark Link incarnation would later reappear in Ocarina of Time, The Oracle of Ages, Twilight Princess, and various other games.

The Legend of Zelda: A Link to the Past (1991) recreated Link in a 16-bit colour palette for the Super Nintendo Entertainment System. It presents the character with the unusual characteristic of pink hair, diverging from the traditional blond or light brown hair seen in other releases. Link's sprite was also designed to appear more expressive, as he was given an animated hat and a face that turns red when attempting to pull objects. The game introduced Link's Master Sword with an early design that would evolve over subsequent games. In contrast to the in-game sprite, the game manual depicts Link as a tall blond character. The story describes Link trying to intercept the wizard Agahnim before he breaks the seal on the Dark World and unleashes Ganon's fury upon Hyrule. To stop him, Link collects three magical Pendants of Virtue and claims the Master Sword, then ventures into the Dark World to rescue the Seven Sages, after which he is able to defeat Agahnim and Ganon.

The Legend of Zelda: Link's Awakening was released in 1993 for the Game Boy, making it the first handheld title in the series. Link appeared in monochrome until the DX port brought the game to the Game Boy Color. The storyline takes place on a mysterious island called Koholint after Link is washed ashore. The game involves collecting eight musical instruments from eight dungeons in order to wake the sleeping Wind Fish, which is imprisoned inside an enormous egg. Various concepts were introduced to gameplay, including jumping and side-scrolling. Link appears in the 2019 remake The Legend of Zelda: Link's Awakening for the Nintendo Switch in 3D form.

The Legend of Zelda: Ocarina of Time (1998) was released for the Nintendo 64 (N64) and is the first 3D game in the Zelda series. It was a landmark game in terms of the detail and quality of the graphics and the influence it had on later video games. The game was the first to include Link's horse Epona. Link appears in two forms, as a younger and older version of the same character wearing his green tunic. The game is one of a few in the series that presents Link as a child, carrying the Hylian Shield and a slingshot for a weapon. The plot involves Link travelling between the present and the future by using the titular Ocarina of Time in order to stop Ganondorf's takeover of Hyrule. As a result, Link comes to be known as the "Hero of Time" and is successful in stopping Ganondorf both in the present and in the future. Link is accompanied by the fairy Navi, who gives him hints about enemies and his surroundings. In 2011, Link also appeared in The Legend of Zelda: Ocarina of Time 3D, a remake of the original 1998 game for the Nintendo 3DS.

Link returned in 2000 with the release of The Legend of Zelda: Majora's Mask on the N64. It reused character and scenery models from Ocarina of Time but added some surreal effects and colours to create a darker entry than its predecessors. The game includes four main dungeons and various side quests. In the storyline, Link appears as a child and must save the land of Termina from the evil of Majora's Mask, which has drawn the moon into a decaying orbit, threatening to crash into Termina's primary town, Clock Town, in three days. Link uses the Ocarina of Time to play the Song of Time, which allows him to repeatedly travel back in time to relive those three days until he successfully prevents the disaster. During the game, Link finds various magical masks that transform him into a Goron, Deku Scrub, or Zora. In the final boss battle with Majora, Link is transformed into Fierce Deity Link, a dark, adult version of himself with white eyes, before finally reverting to his child form. In 2015 The Legend of Zelda: Majora's Mask 3D revisited the game for the Nintendo 3DS.

The Legend of Zelda: Oracle of Seasons and Legend of Zelda: Oracle of Ages are a pair of interconnected games released in 2001 for the Game Boy Color. The two games were outsourced to a developer named Flagship and were originally designed as a trio, but the plan proved to be too complicated. Like Link's Awakening, Link is controlled from a top-down perspective within a flat 2D game world. The two games are interlinked, with completion of one game unlocking secrets within the other. The plot involves Link being sent on a mission to the foreign lands of Holodrum and Labrynna in order to stop the disruption of the seasons by the General of Darkness, Onox, and the disruption of time by the Sorceress of Shadows, Veran. Link's key tools for uncovering areas and fighting his enemies are the Rod of Seasons and his magic harp.

In 2002, Nintendo published The Legend of Zelda: A Link to the Past & Four Swords on the Game Boy Advance. Four Swords was an original title packaged together with the rereleased entry A Link to the Past. Diverging from the traditional single-player approach, Four Swords was based on cooperative gameplay, allowing four players to interact together by connecting four Game Boy Advance systems. In Four Swords, four Links of different colours appear, each of which is controlled by a different player. The four versions of Link must then work together to complete the game's challenges.

The Legend of Zelda: The Wind Waker was released in 2002 on the GameCube. It marked a radical change for the series and depicted Link and the game environment in a cute childlike graphical style. Link was depicted as a preteen cartoon character with a large head and huge eyes. In the storyline, Link's younger sister Aryll is kidnapped, and he embarks on a voyage to rescue her. He joins a pirate crew and travels the vast ocean to explore the many islands that are dotted around the map to encounter characters and uncover dungeons. Link's key tool is the titular Wind Waker, a magical baton that enables him to manipulate the breeze as he crosses the Great Sea. A sequel to The Wind Waker was planned but was later abandoned in favor of Twilight Princess. Nintendo artist Satoru Takizawa explained the reason for the cancellation was that "Wind Waker 2 would have taken place in a more land-based setting, rather than on the sea, so that we could have Link gallop across the land on a horse. But Link's proportions in Wind Waker weren’t very well suited for riding on horseback; he was too short, and an adult version of Toon Link did not seem appropriate either." In 2013 The Legend of Zelda: The Wind Waker HD revisited Link's voyage across the Great Sea on the Wii U.

The Legend of Zelda: Four Swords Adventures, which was published for the GameCube in 2004, again reinterpreted traditional Zelda gameplay with a multiplayer approach. The plot centres on Link being split into four versions of himself by the Four Sword, resulting in four Links of different colours. He must embark on a quest that involves rescuing seven princesses from an evil sorcerer. The game depicts the Links in a 16-bit top-down perspective and involves each player controlling one of the four Links to explore the game world and defeat enemies in order to complete each level.

The release of The Legend of Zelda: The Minish Cap in 2004 on the Game Boy Advance returned the series to a single-player format. Link appears as a child viewed from a top-down perspective and is tasked with saving his friend Princess Zelda. After a mysterious stranger arrives at a festival celebrating the coming of the Picori, he destroys the sacred Picori Blade and turns Zelda to stone. During the game, Link is accompanied by a magical talking cap named Ezlo, who helps him on his quest and teaches him to shrink to the size of the Minish.

The Legend of Zelda: Twilight Princess (2006) was released on the GameCube and Wii and offers a darker adventure to previous entries in the series. The game features a more detailed depiction of a teenage Link who appears ready for battle wearing chainmail beneath his tunic. In the early part of the game, he becomes trapped in the Twilight, which transforms him into a wolf. Throughout the game, he is aided by Midna, an imp-like creature, who rides on his back and helps him on his quest. The game uses a variety of animal abilities for progression, such as the ability to follow scents. Twilight Princess aimed to provide a stark contrast to the cartoonish style of The Wind Waker, presenting a game world drained of colour and a story with a more mature tone. In 2016, Link appeared in The Legend of Zelda: Twilight Princess HD, a remaster for the Wii U.

The direct sequel to The Wind Waker, The Legend of Zelda: Phantom Hourglass, was released in 2007 for the Nintendo DS. It follows Link as he embarks on a journey to save his friend Tetra. The game was designed to appeal to a wider audience, with 3D cel-shaded graphics and a light-hearted tone. It takes inspiration form the style and tone of The Wind Waker, with Toon Link displaying various humorous expressions. The game made use of the console's touchscreen functionality, which enabled the player to control Link using a stylus instead of the traditional button controls.

Following on from Phantom Hourglass, The Legend of Zelda: Spirit Tracks (2009) reintroduced Toon Link to the Nintendo DS. The game is a sequel to its predecessor and has a similar format but replaces sailing by boat with travelling by train. Link must explore four main map pieces, return the power of the spirit tracks using the Spirit Flute, and navigate the Spirit Tower, the main labyrinth hub, aided by the spirit of Zelda. The gameplay also incorporates the mechanic of controlling both Link and Zelda in a series of cooperative puzzles and boss battles.

The Legend of Zelda: Skyward Sword was released on the Wii in 2011 and made use of the Wii Motion Plus as the central game mechanic, giving the player the ability to control Link's sword using motion controls. The Wii Motion Plus is used to swipe the sword in combat, control Link's mechanical beetle, and control the movements of his loftwing as he flies through the skies. The plot establishes a central timeline for the other games in the series and was designed to be an origin story for the Master Sword. It also involves a romantic relationship between Link and Zelda. The storyline begins in Skyloft, a land floating above the clouds, where Link is the childhood friend of Zelda. He is forced to descend to the surface after Zelda is kidnapped. He then travels between the two lands wielding the Goddess Sword, a magical sword that holds a spirit named Fi, who acts as his guide. During his journey, Link imbues the Goddess Sword with three sacred flames, which results in it being reforged into the Master Sword. Link also appears in The Legend of Zelda: Skyward Sword HD (2021), a remastered version of the game for the Nintendo Switch.

The Legend of Zelda: A Link Between Worlds was released in 2013 for the Nintendo 3DS and is a sequel to A Link to the Past. The plot revolves around a sorcerer named Yuga who has the ability to merge into walls and turn people into paintings. Link must foil his plan to revive Ganon. The storyline is set within the same world as A Link to the Past and was designed with a similar art style. Players are able to explore the two separate worlds of Hyrule and Lorule, which are reminiscent of the contrasting worlds of light and dark in A Link to the Past. The game introduced the ability for Link to turn into a painting, allowing him to walk along walls and switch between the two worlds.

The Legend of Zelda: Tri Force Heroes (2015) was the second original Zelda entry for the Nintendo 3DS and a departure from the series' tradition, with a focus on a three-player cooperative campaign. Link appears alongside two companions that can be stacked to reach high places, solve puzzles and defeat tall enemies. The storyline revolves around the theme of fashion and is set in the realm of Hytopia, where a witch has cursed Princess Styla to wear an ugly brown body suit. As a result, the Hytopian king calls for adventurers to break the curse. The gameplay departs from the usual Zelda open-world structure and involves completing dungeons and collecting materials to fashion outfits that provide specific abilities.

The Legend of Zelda: Breath of the Wild was released on the Nintendo Switch and Wii U in 2017 and reinvented the franchise with significant changes to visuals and gameplay. It moved away from the rigid structure of preceding games and created a massive open world for Link to explore. He has the ability to climb most surfaces, allowing the player to explore the vast terrain. The addition of a paraglider also gives Link the ability to jump from structures and soar across the sky. Link was also designed to interact with the surrounding environment, collecting materials for cooking and reacting to cold and heat. The game introduced significant changes to Link's design, notably the absence of his signature green outfit. It allows players to dress Link in a variety of outfits, including his blue Champion's Tunic, and places more emphasis on his bow as a prominent weapon. The storyline centers around Link waking without his memories after a century in a stasis pod called the "Shrine of Resurrection" and discovering that Calamity Ganon has taken control of Hyrule Castle and that Hyrule has fallen into ruin.

Link is due to appear in The Legend of Zelda: Tears of the Kingdom in 2023. Nintendo released a teaser trailer as part of its E3 2021 Nintendo Direct, showing an altered version of Link from Breath of the Wild. The upcoming game is a direct sequel to the previous game and is set in the same version of Hyrule.

Spin-off games 
In 1989, Link appeared in Zelda, which was released in the Game & Watch series of handheld electronic games. The unit features a multi-screen liquid-crystal display (LCD). The lower display is used for the main gameplay which involves Link fighting against dungeon monsters, while the upper display features the inventory and another small game screen. The gameplay of the Game & Watch unit ZL-65 is simpler than that of an NES game and features a story that replaces Ganon with eight dragons that kidnap Zelda. After battling through a dungeon, Link must defeat a dragon on the upper screen to receive a piece of the Triforce, before freeing Zelda with the eight recovered Triforce pieces.

1989 was also the release year of The Legend of Zelda Game Watch, which was part of the LCD wristwatch product line licensed to and developed by Nelsonic Industries. In addition to its timekeeping function, the unit features gameplay based on the original The Legend of Zelda game but without a storyline. It features Link adventuring through eight dungeons comprising four rooms in each.

Link appears in Zelda no Densetsu: Kamigami no Triforce (Barcode Battler II), which was released by Epoch Co. in 1992 in Japan but not in North America. It was developed for the Barcode Battler II console and involves swiping cards to unlock various characters from A Link to the Past.

In 1993 and 1996, Link appeared in Link: The Faces of Evil, Zelda: The Wand of Gamelon and Zelda's Adventure, although he is playable only in The Faces of Evil and relegated to a secondary role in The Wand of Gamelon and Zelda's Adventure. At the beginning of The Faces of Evil, Link and the King of Hyrule are visited by a wizard named Gwonam, who tells them that Ganon and his servants have seized the peaceful island of Koridai and captured Zelda. After being informed that only he can defeat Ganon, Link travels to Koridai to find the magical artifact known as the Book of Koridai. In the latter two games, the roles are reversed and Zelda has to rescue Link from Ganon. While the comics were licensed by Nintendo to use official Zelda characters, none of them were produced or supervised by Nintendo. As well as being critically panned, none of these games (which were produced for the Philips CD-i multimedia player) are recognized by Nintendo as part of the series' official chronology. Unlike the main games, Link has the ability to speak and is voiced by Jeffrey Rath. His personality mirrors his animated series counterpart in which he yearns for adventure and is constantly trying to get a kiss from Zelda.

In 2007, Nintendo released a shooting video game for the Wii titled Link's Crossbow Training. It is set within the Zelda universe and features Link as a playable character holding a crossbow. The game revisits the world of Twilight Princess and features the same landmarks and enemies. It involves the use of the Wii remote and nunchuck to create a light gun, which targets enemies with an onscreen reticule.

Link appears in the 2014 hack and slash video game Hyrule Warriors as a playable character. This incarnation is a Hyrulian soldier-in-training who helps to lead the campaign against the forces of evil. Young Link from Ocarina of Time and Majora's Mask also appears in the game as a playable character via downloadable content, while Toon Link from The Wind Waker appears as a playable character in Hyrule Warriors Legends, the Nintendo 3DS port of Warriors.

Link also appears as a playable character in the 2019 Nintendo Switch rhythm game Cadence of Hyrule, a crossover between Crypt of the NecroDancer and The Legend of Zelda series.

In 2020, Link reappeared as a playable character in Hyrule Warriors: Age of Calamity, which acts as a prequel to Breath of the Wild and exists within the same game world. Link's appearance is similar to this previous incarnation and includes the same game mechanics featured in Breath of the Wild, such as the use of the Sheikah Slate and the ability to use a sword and a shield for parrying. He is accompanied by a roster of characters to fight alongside on the battlefield. The storyline centres around Zelda struggling to unlock her powers and the Champions battling against the newly resurrected Ganon. The game progresses in the form of various missions that must be completed to level up Link and his allies.

For the 35th anniversary of The Legend of Zelda series, Nintendo released Game & Watch: The Legend of Zelda in 2021. The unit was designed with a green colour scheme, metallic gold front plate and light up Triforce on the reverse. It includes the original The Legend of Zelda game, Zelda II: The Adventure of Link, Link's Awakening and also a version of the 1980 Game & Watch title Vermin which features Link in the main role. The clock function also depicts Link fighting various enemies.

Other game series 

Link has appeared in other game series and his weapons and outfits have also appeared in several games. A reference to Link appears in the Japanese release of the NES game Final Fantasy, where a grave in Elfheim is marked "Here lies Link". Among SNES games, Link makes a cameo in Donkey Kong Country 2: Diddy's Kong Quest where he is ranked against the player next to Mario and Yoshi. Alongside Samus Aran, he makes a cameo in Super Mario RPG, where they are seen sleeping in separate beds at an inn.

He is a playable character in the Super Smash Bros. series and has appeared in every title since the first Super Smash Bros. on the Nintendo 64. In 2008, Toon Link from The Wind Waker appeared in Super Smash Bros. Brawl on the Wii. He was also introduced in 2014 in Super Smash Bros. for Nintendo 3DS and Wii U. Link later returned in Super Smash Bros. Ultimate for the Nintendo Switch in various incarnations, including Young Link, Toon Link, green tunic Link and the version wearing his blue tunic from Breath of the Wild.

In the GameCube version of Namco's Soulcalibur II, Link is a featured character and wields his signature weapons from the Zelda series. Miyamoto did not see a problem with Link appearing in what some had thought to be a "violent fighting game", as he had already been established as a fighter in the Super Smash Bros. series. Link was planned to appear together with Metroid series protagonist Samus Aran in Marvel: Ultimate Alliance, but was later removed. As part of the styling of a Zelda-themed game mode, he is featured in the 2006 puzzle video game Tetris DS. In Scribblenauts Unlimited, many Zelda series characters are summonable in the Wii U version, including Link. He is referenced by an archer dressed in green in The Legend of Zelda: Battle Quest, a mini game in the 2012 party game Nintendo Land, which involves archery and sword fighting in a cloth style. His signature green outfit also appears alongside that of Samus in Dynasty Warriors VS for the Nintendo 3DS. Link appears in Sonic Lost World as part of "The Legend of Zelda Zone", where he rides his signature Crimson Loftwing. In the 2013 compilation game NES Remix, players can play remixed portions of NES games, including playing as Link in a level of Donkey Kong.

The Skyward Sword incarnation of Link was introduced as a playable character in Mario Kart 8, along with the "Hyrule Circuit" race track, the "Triforce Cup" and a vehicle set consisting of the "Master Cycle", "Triforce Tires" and "Hylian Kite". In Mario Kart 8 Deluxe, the Breath of the Wild incarnation also appears, along with the Master Cycle Zero, Ancient Tires, and Paraglider from the same game. He is referenced in 2015 downloadable content for Monster Hunter 4 with armor resembling his tunic, Monster Hunter Generations DLC and also Monster Hunter Stories. Incarnations of Link from The Legend of Zelda, The Wind Waker, Twilight Princess and Tri Force Heroes also appear as "Mystery Mushroom" costumes in Super Mario Maker. In 2016, Link appeared in a 3DS game titled My Nintendo Picross - The Legend of Zelda: Twilight Princess, a picture-puzzle game made available through the My Nintendo rewards program. The Master Sword and Hylian Shield appear alongside Link's Champion's Tunic from Breath of the Wild as Amiibo-unlocked content in the Nintendo Switch version of The Elder Scrolls V: Skyrim. In 2019, Link was added as a playable character in the 2.0.0 update to Super Mario Maker 2, which features the Master Sword power-up changing the Mario characters into Link.

Television series 
In The Legend of Zelda animated series, Link, voiced by Jonathan Potts, features in a set of cartoons which aired from 1989 to 1990 as a part of DIC's The Super Mario Bros. Super Show!. Based loosely on the first game, the cartoons present Link as a rude, lovesick teenager. The plot revolves around Link living in Hyrule Castle and being recruited to protect the Triforce of Wisdom from Ganon, while accompanied by a fairy princess named Spryte. Over the course of the series he persistently attempts to kiss Zelda and exclaims the catchphrase "Well excuuuuuse me, Princess!" when tired with her attitude. Thirteen episodes were produced before the cancellation of The Super Mario Bros. Super Show.

A similar version of Link and Zelda appear during the second season of Captain N: The Game Master. The storyline involves a character named Kevin being sucked into a TV and entering a game world. During three episodes, he helps Link and Zelda to stop Ganon from reviving to protect the Triforce.

Throughout 2013 and 2014, Link appeared in a series of comedic shorts titled The Legend of Zelda: The Misadventures of Link. The series made its debut on Nintendo Video, a video on demand service for the Nintendo 3DS. The series was based on The Wind Waker HD and aimed to present Link "in a new and hysterical light."

In 2015, news of a planned live-action series based on The Legend of Zelda was widely reported online. According to comedian Adam Conover, the proposed series was cancelled by Nintendo after someone from Netflix leaked the project.

Comics and manga 

Following the release of the original game, Link appeared in manga-style novels published by Futabasha, including The Legend of Zelda: The Mirage Castle, which was published in Japanese in 1986. A similar book titled The Legend of Zelda: The Triforce of the Gods was released in 1992 with a storyline based on A Link to the Past.

In the early 1990s, Valiant Comics published a serial comic based on The Legend of Zelda series. The comic series lasted for only five issues, with a sixth story published as part of the Nintendo Comics System. In this incarnation, Link's appearance was based on the original video game, giving him red hair, instead of his typical blonde or brown hair. However, the storyline reflects The Legend of Zelda animated television series, which was being aired around the same time. Link and Zelda's relationship is depicted as amorous, with Link attempting to get a kiss from Zelda and Zelda returning Link's affections.

A serial comic was created for Nintendo Power magazine by Japanese manga artist Shotaro Ishinomori. It was published in 1992 and later collected in graphic novel form in 1993. The plot is an alternate version of the storyline from A Link to the Past. Several other manga adaptations have been published by Viz Media based on the Zelda video games, including Ocarina of Time, Majora's Mask, A Link to the Past and The Minish Cap, which were illustrated by Akira Himekawa. The Japanese artist duo also wrote the long-running Twilight Princess manga, which began as a Japanese serialisation in 2016 followed by an English translation in 2017 and has been released as a series of volumes.

Nintendo published Link's Hijinks, a translated web comic by Saitaro Komatsu on its Play Nintendo website. The comic had originally appeared in the Japanese manga magazine CoroCoro Comic.

Gamebooks 
Nintendo published several gamebooks based on The Legend of Zelda series. As part of the Nintendo Adventure Book series, which was similar to the Choose Your Own Adventure books, two books were published in 1992 titled The Crystal Trap and The Shadow Prince. In The Crystal Trap, the storyline involves Zelda saving Link from the trap, while in The Shadow Prince, Link must save Zelda with the help of a character named Charles. In 2001, two books based on The Legend of Zelda: Oracle of Seasons and Oracle of Ages were published by Scholastic, which were written by Craig Wessel and feature Link in a storyline based on the video games.

Reception

Critical reception 

Link has been well received by video game critics. In a section titled "top ten forces of good" in their 2004 list of top 50 retro game heroes, Retro Gamer noted that Link is "one of the longest running gaming legends." Game Informer chose Link as the number one "Hero of 2006". CNET declared him the second top comic book character of all time in 2009. UGO.com ranked Link in first place on a list of comic book characters who need their own movies, adding, "Get Peter Jackson or Guillermo del Toro to do it, dump a ton of money into it, and we'll all die happy." In 2013, Complex ranked him as the sixth "most badass" comic book character of all time, as well as the fourth best video game mascot of all time. GamesRadar staff ranked Link as one their "100 best heroes in video games", published in 2013. In 2020, Esquire listed Link in "The 50 Best Video Game Characters of All Time". In 2021, Riley McAtee for The Ringer opined, "A mute but courageous hero was the perfect character for a fantasy adventure game in the 1980s. Some 35 years later, video game storytelling has evolved, as has the Legend of Zelda franchise. But Link hasn't. He hasn't needed to. He's been the perfect video game character all along." Chris Morgan for Yardbarker described Link as one of "the most memorable characters from old school Nintendo games". HobbyConsolas included Link in "The 30 best heroes of the last 30 years," while Rachel Weber of GamesRadar ranked Link as 7th of their "50 iconic video game characters."

The character is also popular among the video game fan community. In the 1988 and 1989 Nintendo Power Awards, readers voted him as the best character. He was also voted by readers as the first and third "Best Hero" in the 1993 and 1994 Nintendo Power Awards respectively. In one of IGN's 2007 Hero Showdowns and in Screw Attack's Death Battle, Link was voted the favorite over Cloud Strife. In 2010, Nintendo Power chose Link as their second favorite hero, commenting that his courage always wins out over evil.

Link has also proven to be a popular guest character in other video games series. In 2008, IGN ranked him as the best bonus character in the Soul Calibur series, while GameDaily ranked him first on a list of top ten Smash Bros. characters. Polygons Jeremy Parish ranked 73 fighters from Super Smash Bros. Ultimate from "garbage to glorious," praising Toon Link and placing him in seventh place unlike his other character incarnations, and stating that Toon Link is another version of Link "but this one is also the single most expressive fighter on the Smash roster." Gavin Jasper of Den of Geek also praised and ranked Link as sixth on his list of Super Smash Bros. Ultimate characters, and stated that "I really like that he's functionally the exact same as his Smash predecessors despite being a different Link. It's really what I see as the soul of Link himself. He's not just a generic hero, but a force of pure mythology."

Critics and gamers have also commented on Link's sexual attractiveness. In June 2006, Link was chosen as the "Hottest Video Game Character" by Out magazine for his appearance in Twilight Princess, describing him as "Nintendo's sexy farm-boy-turned-wolf". A survey conducted from December 2019 to November 2020 placed Link in top position of a list of the sexiest male video game characters based on 20 fan sources and Google search data. Brian Feldman for New York magazine remarked, "For three decades, gamers have been horny for Link, and finally, Nintendo has acknowledged that Link is a hot, sexy boy who will fight for your honor" and highlighted that this aspect of Link is particularly emphasised by the reactions of several side characters in Breath of the Wild.  The relationship between Link and Princess Zelda was also ranked as the number one video game romance by James Hawkins of Joystick Division, who commented, "Never overtly called-out and not yet actualized, this tacit romance has shaped one of gaming's greatest franchises."

Critical commentary 
Link's character has been the subject of critical commentary with regards to his role as the protagonist of the series. Kyle Wizner for Screen Rant commented on Link's character as a silent protagonist, stating that Breath of the Wild'''s attempt at a more compelling story was, "successful in some regards", but "the most significant problem with Link as a main character is also the most obvious: He doesn't speak. The silent protagonist is a gaming trope as old as any, but as it becomes less common in the modern era of video games, its issues become more obvious." However, in a 2016 interview Eiji Aonuma gave an opinion about giving Link a voice, saying, "while in some ways I do feel that it could be good to have a game where he speaks, part of me also feels that that air of proud independence he has because he doesn't speak is a precious part of the individuality of his character."

Writing for Den of Geek, Ryan Lambie described Link's character as "the videogame equivalent of Tintin" because he is "the archetypal young hero, embodying all the optimism, generosity and spirit of adventure a broad fantasy action game requires. And just as Tintin's simple design served as a reader's entry point into Hergé's stories, Link acts as the player's eyes and ears in Hyrule, a filter through which audiences can experience the colourful characters, action and perils the world constantly introduces." He further commented that Link is one of the most enduring video game characters because he is "a sympathetic hero" and "the ultimate videogame underdog. He really is an ordinary yet brave little guy who wants to save the world, in spite of insurmountable odds."

Sara Gitkos for iMore questioned Link's role as the series protagonist, despite Zelda being the titular character. She commented that since the start of the series, "Zelda served as the prize at the end of Link's long traveled tunnel" and played the role of the damsel in distress, although in recent games, she has "acted more as a partner to Link rather than an object to save". However, she also noted that it would be difficult to change this because, "Though players take control of Link and he "acts" as the protagonist, the silent hero is really just the vessel for players to control. He doesn't have any character to speak of, but rather is the place holder for us, and we become him."

In 2016, video game websites GameSpot and Kotaku consulted Eiji Aonuma regarding the possibility of producing a Zelda game led by a female version of Link. Aonuma responded by stating, "We thought about it and decided that if we're going to have a female protagonist, it's simpler to have Princess Zelda as the main character." However, this idea was abandoned because "if we have Princess Zelda as the main character who fights, then what is Link going to do?" Jacob Krastenakes writing for The Verge opined, "Switching the two characters wouldn't even require Link to be completely absent — he could simply be the other character, who is off doing their own thing." Aonuma also referred to the balance of the Triforce as a reason for not creating a female Link, stating, "The Triforce is made up of Princess Zelda, Ganon, and Link. Princess Zelda is obviously female. If we made Link a female we thought that would mess with the balance of the Triforce. That's why we decided not to do it." In 2015, Nintendo announced a female version of Link named Linkle for the 2016 Nintendo 3DS release Hyrule Warriors Legends. Miyamoto confirmed that Link would continue to be the main character of the series in an interview with Game Kult, stating, "in the classic games in the series, Link is the hero and that will not change."

Jonathan Homes writing for Destructoid commented on the ambiguity of Link's character, asking, "Is Link an individual, or is he (or she) a blank slate avatar meant to represent the player?" He continued by stating, "Nintendo has done an admirable job of concocting a way to help fans to imagine Link as both a specific person and an abstract concept at the same time. He’s actually not always named Link. You, the player, choose his name before starting each of his games. He also never speaks, further solidifying him as non-character  only purpose is to act as doorway for the player into the game world. Yet, by leaning hard on both the reincarnation myth and the use of multiple timelines, Nintendo has managed to shape Link into a series of individual characters in the minds of many."

 Legacy 

As the mascot of The Legend of Zelda series, Link has become a widely recognisable character in pop culture. Due to his popularity with gamers, his signature green outfit combined with the Master Sword and Hylian Shield is a popular choice with fans for cosplay. His image has been recreated in numerous works of fan art. He has been the subject of numerous internet memes that focus on the common misconception that Link is named Zelda due to him being the protagonist of the series. He has also appeared in the form of various merchandise, including figurines, Amiibo, plush toys, and apparel. Guinness World Records reported that as of 1 February 2018, Link is the most prolific Nintendo character released as an Amiibo, with 11 different versions, including Toon Link, Wolf Link and Link (Rider) from Breath of the Wild. Since the release of Super Smash Bros. Ultimate on 7 December 2018, he also holds the Guinness World Record as the most ubiquitous action-adventure video game character, having appeared in 40 unique video games, not including rereleases and HD remasters.

In 2001, the Guinness World Records Gamer's Edition recognised Link as the second best video game character of all time, behind Mario. In 2005, he was awarded a star on the Walk of Game along with his creator, Shigeru Miyamoto. In 2011, Empire ranked Link as the sixth greatest comic book character, stating "Shigeru Miyamoto's most famous creation aside from a certain moustachioed plumber, Link has grown into one of the world's most celebrated console heroes, and helped establish RPGs as an international gaming standard." In 2017, Time named Link as 11th on its "Most Influential Video Game Characters of All Time", stating, "The protagonist of each The Legend of Zelda series installment, Link embodies the selfless hero on a transformative journey, a storytelling trope we've seen in countless titles from Mass Effect's Commander Shepard to Halo's Master Chief." On 26 October 2018, Guinness World Records named Link as the "most critically acclaimed videogame playable character", as he has appeared in six unique entries in GameRankings.com's list of the top 100 all-time best reviewed videogames, with Nintendo's Super Mario and Konami's Solid Snake being his closest competitors. In 2020, James McMahon for The Independent listed Link in fourth place in the "Top 20 most iconic video game characters of all time", commenting, "You star in over 19 instalments of what's largely considered the greatest RPG series of all time. In your own animated TV series. Your own manga. Your own board game (three of those actually). Not only that, but one of your last rides out – 2017's Breath of the Wild'' – is frequently discussed in the conversation entitled, "What's the Greatest Video Game Ever?" And after all this? You're not only not Nintendo's most famous character – you don't even get your name in the title of the franchise you've helmed since 1986! The Legend of Link perhaps doesn't have the same ring to it, but it's the little green one who runs this manor, not Zelda."

See also 
 Characters of The Legend of Zelda

Notes

References

External links 

 Link on Play.Nintendo.com

Action video game characters
Video game characters introduced in 1986
Fictional archers
Fictional child soldiers
Cryonically preserved characters in video games
Fictional dragonslayers
Fictional humanoids
Male characters in video games
Musician characters in video games
Nintendo protagonists
Orphan characters in video games
Silent protagonists
Teenage characters in video games
Time travelers
Super Smash Bros. fighters
The Legend of Zelda characters
Video game mascots
Video game characters who use magic
Fictional swordfighters in video games
Fictional knights in video games